Veljko Batrović (born 5 March 1994) is a Montenegrin professional footballer who plays as an attacking midfielder for Greek Super League 2 club Anagennisi Karditsa.

Club career
Born in Podgorica, son of a former Partizan player Zoran Batrović, he went through many youth football systems including local FK Bubamara Revita, FK Partizan and FK Mogren before making his professional debut with FK Zeta in the 2010–11 Montenegrin First League.

Widzew Łódź
On January 28, 2012, he signed a three-and-a-half-year contract with Widzew Łódź in Poland.
On 8 April 2013, he scored his first goal of his professional career against Polonia Warsaw.

Etar
On 17 January 2018, Batrović joined the Bulgarian First League team Etar Veliko Tarnovo.

Septemvri Sofia
Batrović signed a one-and-a-half year contract with Bulgarian Second League team Septemvri Sofia in February 2020.

International career
Batrović made his debut for Montenegro U21 on September 10, 2013, in a 3–2 win against Romania U21.

References

External links
 
 

1994 births
Living people
Footballers from Podgorica
Association football wingers
Association football midfielders
Montenegrin footballers
Montenegro under-21 international footballers
FK Partizan players
FK Mogren players
FK Zeta players
Widzew Łódź players
NK Zavrč players
NK Domžale players
NK Krško players
SFC Etar Veliko Tarnovo players
FK Radnički Niš players
FC Septemvri Sofia players
Panachaiki F.C. players
Olympiacos Volos F.C. players
Asteras Vlachioti F.C. players
Montenegrin First League players
Ekstraklasa players
Slovenian PrvaLiga players
First Professional Football League (Bulgaria) players
Serbian SuperLiga players
Super League Greece 2 players
Montenegrin expatriate footballers
Expatriate footballers in Poland
Montenegrin expatriate sportspeople in Poland
Expatriate footballers in Slovenia
Montenegrin expatriate sportspeople in Slovenia
Expatriate footballers in Bulgaria
Montenegrin expatriate sportspeople in Bulgaria
Expatriate footballers in Serbia
Montenegrin expatriate sportspeople in Serbia
Expatriate footballers in Greece
Montenegrin expatriate sportspeople in Greece